Canal+ (Canal Plus, meaning 'Channel Plus'; sometimes abbreviated C+ or Canal) is a French premium television channel launched in 1984. It is 100% owned by the Groupe Canal+, which in turn is owned by Vivendi. The channel broadcasts several kinds of programming, mostly encrypted. Unencrypted programming can be viewed free of charge on Canal+ and on satellite on Canal+ Clair (Clear). The channel does not broadcast advertising, except when broadcasting on free-to-air slots. Almost all foreign films and series are broadcast in their original language with French subtitles on a secondary audio channel and dubbed in French. All programs are subtitled in French for deaf people and those who struggle with hearing. Some programs also have audio description for those who are visually impaired.

Canal+ is a supporter of the Hybrid Broadcast Broadband TV (HbbTV) initiative, which promotes and establishes an open European standard for hybrid set-top boxes for the reception of broadcast TV and broadband multimedia applications with a single user interface.
Since November 2017, Canal+ began to expand their catalogue internationally through the international feed, Canal+ International.

History
After the announcement about the launch of the fourth French television channel, Canal+ started broadcasting on 4 November 1984. In 1986, the channel had one million subscribers. It has produced numerous films of auteurs, including David Lynch's The Straight Story, Mulholland Dr., and Inland Empire.

Originally, subscribers would be mailed a code to punch in on their decoder's control panel to view the encrypted service (using the RITC Discret 1 system); the code would be based upon the decoder's serial number (stored in the box's ROM). To avoid problems with customer's codes being not delivered on time by the postal system, Canal+ would switch to encryption based on a generic key, between the last day of the month (beginning at midnight) and the first Monday of the next month (until 9 AM). During this time, all decoders—even those with lapsed subscriptions—would be able to view the channel. However, signal piracy was rampant, after the magazine Radio Plans printed decoder plans in their December 1984 issue. As a result of this, Canal+ switched to the much stronger Nagravision encryption system beginning in 1992; the Discret system was fully phased out by 1995. The new decoders now utilized smart cards, cut into the shape of a key and inserted into the front of the decoder. Different decoders using the D2-MAC standard were also deployed during this time, mostly for cable subscribers. With the launch of CanalSatellite, the Mediaguard encryption system was instituted, created by SECA (Société Européenne de Contrôle d'Accès), a firm owned by Canal+ and Bertelsmann; Canal+ eventually bought out Bertelsmann's stake and rebranded SECA as Canal+ Technologies. This firm was sold by 2003 to Thomson SA. The MediaGuard system's use in Britain (by the now defunct OnDigital/ITV Digital) led to hackers in the employ of Rupert Murdoch's rival encryption company NDS breaking into the MediaGuard system, resulting in new cards being issued to Canal+ subscribers in 2002 and Canal+ starting legal action against Murdoch. The Nagravision system continued in use until 30 November 2011, when all analog television broadcasting in France ceased.

Since 1985, Canal+ has had a tradition of showing one pornographic film every month  at midnight, generally on the first saturday of the month.

From 2000 to 2002, Virginie Calmels successively held two positions, that of financial director and then CEO.

With the launch of the digital satellite provider CanalSatellite on 27 April 1996, Canal+ received two new sister channels: Canal+ Jaune and Canal+ Bleu. A fourth channel, called Canal+ Vert came along on 31 August 1998. The channels changed their names to Canal+ Confort (now known as Canal+ Décalé since 2005), Canal+ Cinéma and Canal+ Sport on 1 November 2003.

In September 2005, Canal+, Canal+ Cinéma and Canal+ Sport started broadcasting in the French digital terrestrial television network. The free-to-air parts of Canal+ had already been broadcasting for a few months by then. In August 2008, Canal+ started broadcasting the encrypted parts of its main channel in high-definition in the terrestrial network. Canal+ announced plans to turn off the analogue terrestrial signals by 2010.

An account of the rise of Canal+ and CanalSatellite, and the establishment of the Canal+ Group as a major satellite broadcaster in Europe is given in the book, High Above, which tells the story of the foundation and development of the leading European satellite operator, Astra.

In February 2013, for €29 million per year, Canal+ bought the TV rights for the FIA Formula One World Championship. The same year, the group bought the rights to the English Premier League, the most watched football league in the world.

In July 2014, the launch of a new pan-African TV channel - A+ - was announced. Based in Abidjan (Ivory Coast), it aims to become the leading television company in French-speaking Africa.

In September 2015, Vincent Bolloré -Chairman of Vivendi- was appointed as chairman of Canal Plus. He changed several former executives and aligned Canal +'s operations with Vivendi's.

On 15 November 2017, Quebec cable system Videotron began carrying Canal+ International, marking it the first provider to carry the channel. It is also the second attempt at making Canal+ available in Canada since the former paid Canal+ Canada channel on Dailymotion, launched in 2013.

As of August 2018, Canal+ International is on U.S. satellite provider DirecTV in HD on channel 2010.

Programmes
Original French TV Shows : 
 Les Guignols de l'info;
 Groland; 
 H; 
 Jamel Comedy Club; 
 Spiral (Engrenages) ; 
 Mafiosa; 
 Le Journal du Hard; 
 Pigalle la Nuit; 
 La Commune; 
 Braquo; 
 Reporters; 
 Scalp; 
 Le Grand Journal; 
 La Matinale; 
 Le petit journal; 
 La Nouvelle Edition; 
 Lundi Investigation; 
 Canal Football Club; 
 Dimanche+; 
 Maison Close; 
 Les Revenants; 
 The Spy; 
 Savages (Les Sauvages)
Original French/British TV Show : 
 Marie Antoinette; 
 Versailles; 
 The Tunnel; 
 War of the Worlds
Original French/German/Italian TV Show : 
 Borgia
Kids Show 
 Teletubbies;
Animated TV Shows : 
 Rugrats (Les Razmokets); 
 Kaeloo; 
 Mia and Me, 
 The Cramp Twins 
 The Tom and Jerry Show.
American TV Shows (simulcasts): 
 24 (24 heures chrono) ; 
 30 Rock; 
 Big Love; 
 Cold Case; 
 Damages; 
 Desperate Housewives; 
 Dexter; 
 Fallen Angels; 
 FlashForward; 
 How I Met Your Mother; 
 It's Always Sunny in Philadelphia (Philadelphia) ; 
 Mad Men; 
 Nurse Jackie; 
 Pushing Daisies; 
 Royal Pains; 
 The Daily Show; 
 The L Word; 
 The New Adventures of Old Christine (Old Christine) ; 
 The Office (U.S.); 
 The Pacific; 
 The Secret Life of the American Teenager (La Vie Secrète d'une Ado Ordinaire) ; 
 The Shield; 
 Two and a Half Men (Mon Oncle Charlie) ; 
 Vampire Diaries; 
 Weeds 
 United States of Tara; 
 Boomtown; 
 Rome; 
 Six Feet Under; 
 Spin City; 
 Surface 
 Will & Grace,
 Game of Thrones.
American adult animated TV Shows : 
 The Simpsons; 
 American Dad!; 
 Drawn Together; 
 Family Guy (Les Griffin) 
 South Park.
American reality TV Shows (simulcast): 
 The Simple Life.
Japanese animated TV Shows : 
 Fullmetal Alchemist; 
 Monster; 
 Noir 
 Samurai Champloo.
 British TV Shows (simulcasts): 
 Skins; 
 Merlin; 
 Wire in the Blood; 
 The Office 
 Spooks (MI-5).
Irish/Canadian TV Shows : 
 The Tudors (Les Tudors).
Canadian TV shows (simulcasts): 
 Flashpoint; 
 Little Mosque on the Prairie, 
 Life with Derek, 
 Naturally Sadie, 
 Total Drama: Revenge of the Island.
Canadian/French TV Shows : 
 Donkey Kong Country (Donkey Kong)
French erotic TV series : 
 X Femmes (2008–2009)
Italian TV Show : 
 The Name of the Rose

Sister channels 
Les Chaînes Canal+ is the brand name used for all the Canal+-branded channels in France. Prior to 2008 it was called Canal+ Le Bouquet.

See also 
Canal+ Group

References

External links
 

 
Television stations in France
French-language television stations
Television channels and stations established in 1984
European Broadcasting Union members
Pay television
Groupe Canal+